The Women's 50m Backstroke at the 2007 World Aquatics Championships took place on 28 March (prelims & semifinals) and the evening of 29 March (finals) at the Rod Laver Arena in Melbourne, Australia. 95 swimmers were entered in the event, of which, 93 swam.

The USA's Natalie Coughlin established a new Championship Record for the distance (28.30) the day prior to the event, with her split from the women's 100m Back final. The record for the distance had been 28.31 by China's Gao Chang from the 2005 Worlds.

Existing records at the start of the event started were:
World Record (WR):  28.19, Janine Pietsch (Germany), 25 May 2005 in Berlin, Germany.
Championship Record (CR): 28.30, Natalie Coughlin (USA), Melbourne 2007 (27 March 2007)

Results

Finals

Semifinals

Preliminaries

References

Women's 50m Backstroke Preliminary results from the 2007 World Championships. Published by OmegaTiming.com (official timer of the '07 Worlds); Retrieved 2009-07-10.
Women's 50m Backstroke Semifinals results from the 2007 World Championships. Published by OmegaTiming.com (official timer of the '07 Worlds); Retrieved 2009-07-10.
Women's 50m Backstroke Final results from the 2007 World Championships. Published by OmegaTiming.com (official timer of the '07 Worlds); Retrieved 2009-07-10.

Swimming at the 2007 World Aquatics Championships
2007 in women's swimming